Tung Chau Street Park is an urban public park in Sham Shui Po, Kowloon, Hong Kong, around the Nam Cheong Estate. It was built as a joint venture between the Urban Council and the Housing Department. The park opened on 29 October 1989 and occupies . It is across the street from Nam Cheong Park, another sizable park.

History
The Urban Council held a formal opening ceremony at the park on 21 April 1990, attended by urban councillors Tong Kam-biu and Ronnie Wong.

Features 
 Basketball courts (2)
 Central piazza
 Children's play area
 Football pitch (5-a-side)
 Indoor games hall
 Activity room
 Squash courts (5)
 Mini football pitch
 Ornamental lake
 Tennis courts (5)
 Toilets and showers

See also
List of urban public parks and gardens in Hong Kong

References

External links 
 Tung Chau Street Park map 

Urban public parks and gardens in Hong Kong
Sham Shui Po
1989 establishments in Hong Kong